The Higgins–Begole Building, or simply Higgins Building, is an historic structure located at 527 5th Avenue in the Gaslamp Quarter, San Diego, in the U.S. state of California. It was built in 1873.

See also
 List of Gaslamp Quarter historic buildings

References

External links

 

1873 establishments in California
Buildings and structures completed in 1873
Buildings and structures in San Diego
Gaslamp Quarter, San Diego